Samuel Keeley (1874–unknown) was a Scottish footballer who played in the Football League for Everton. Keeley's only appearance for Everton came in a 2–0 defeat away at Stoke on 9 April 1898.

References

1874 births
Date of death unknown
Scottish footballers
English Football League players
Association football forwards
Everton F.C. players
Dundee F.C. players